Without Benefit of Clergy is a 1921 American silent drama film directed by James Young and featuring Virginia Brown Faire, Thomas Holding and Boris Karloff. It is based on the story by Rudyard Kipling. A print of the film still exists at the UCLA Film and Television Archives and at Archives Du Film Du CNC (Bois D'Arcy/Paris).

Plot
Holden, a young English engineer in India, falls in love with the native girl Ameera, so he buys her from her mother. Their marital union violates the strict social structure they live in. They live together very happily until their baby son dies. Later, Ameera dies during a cholera epidemic. The film's tagline was "The deathless drama of Ameera, the Hindu girl, and the British engineer, whose "love need no caste." (Print Ad in the Sunday Chronicle, ((Paterson, NJ)) 4 September 1921)

Cast
 Virginia Brown Faire as Ameera
 Thomas Holding as Holden, an American engineer in India
 Evelyn Selbie as Ameera's mother
 Boris Karloff as Ahmed Khan
 Ruth Cummings as Alice Sanders (credited as Ruth Sinclair)
 Nigel De Brulier as Pir Khan
 Percy Marmont
 Philippe De Lacy as Tota, at age 5 (uncredited)
 Otto Lederer as Ahghan the moneylender (uncredited)
 Herbert Prior as Hugh Sanders (uncredited)
 E. G. Miller as Michael Revenish

See also
 Boris Karloff filmography

References

External links

1921 films
1921 drama films
Silent American drama films
American silent feature films
American black-and-white films
Films directed by James Young
Pathé Exchange films
Surviving American silent films
1920s American films